Anton Manolov (born 15 January 1937) is a Bulgarian former sports shooter. He competed at five Olympic games between 1968 and 1992.

See also
 List of athletes with the most appearances at Olympic Games

References

1937 births
Living people
Bulgarian male sport shooters
Olympic shooters of Bulgaria
Shooters at the 1968 Summer Olympics
Shooters at the 1972 Summer Olympics
Shooters at the 1976 Summer Olympics
Shooters at the 1980 Summer Olympics
Shooters at the 1992 Summer Olympics
Sportspeople from Sofia
20th-century Bulgarian people